Guitjo is a plucked string instrument in the guitar or banjo family.
 Guitjo (six-string), a six-string banjo with the neck of a guitar, also known as a banjitar or banjo guitar
 Guitjo (double-neck), a (generally) fourteen-string instrument with two necks on a single guitar-like resonating body